George Ballie Springston (November 11, 1898 – December 30, 1963) was an American college football and basketball player and coach. He served as the head football coach at American University in Washington, D.C. from 1925 to 1928.

References

External links
 

1898 births
1963 deaths
American men's basketball players
American Eagles athletic directors
American Eagles football coaches
American Eagles men's basketball coaches
Basketball coaches from Illinois
Basketball players from Illinois
Illinois Fighting Illini football players
George Washington Colonials football players
George Washington Colonials men's basketball players
Sportspeople from Peoria, Illinois